Anne of Avonlea is a film made for television 6-part miniseries, developed in the United Kingdom by the BBC as a sequel to its 1972 Anne of Green Gables miniseries. It is based on Anne of Avonlea (1909) and Anne of the Island (1915), both sequels to the 1908 novel Anne of Green Gables by Lucy Maud Montgomery. This British version was directed by Joan Craft, with Kim Braden in the role of Anne. Both had previously worked on the 1972 adaptation of the preceding novel.

Cast
 Kim Braden as Anne Shirley
 Barbara Hamilton as Marilla Cuthbert
 Madge Ryan as Rachel Lynde

Plot
Anne begins a new job as a teacher at the local school. While working there, she continues to pursue her dream of becoming a published writer by winning a baking soda company's essay contest; fends off several suitors; and returns to Green Gables whenever she can to visit her adoptive mother, Marilla.

Archive status
Although the prequel Anne of Green Gables is considered lost, Anne of Avonlea has survived intact and is available on DVD.

See also
 Anne of Green Gables
 Anne of Green Gables: The Sequel (1987 film)

External links

References

Anne of Green Gables films
1970s British drama television series
British television films
Anne of Green Gables television series